The 1911 Kentucky Derby was the 37th running of the Kentucky Derby. The race took place on May 13, 1911.  Meridian's winning time of 2:05.00 set a new Derby record.

Full results

Winning Breeder: Charles L. Harrison; (KY)
Horses Jabot, Ramazan, and Captain Carmody scratched before the race.

Payout

 The winner received a purse of $4,850.
 Second place received $700.
 Third place received $300.

References

1911
Kentucky Derby
Derby
May 1911 sports events